Group & Organization Management is a bimonthly peer-reviewed academic journal that covers the fields of industrial and organizational psychology and management. The editor-in-chief is Yannick J-L. Griep (Radboud University, The Netherlands). It was established in 1976 and is published by SAGE Publications.

Abstracting and indexing
The journal is abstracted and indexed in:

According to the Journal Citation Reports, the journal has a 2021 impact factor of 4.290 .

References

External links

SAGE Publishing academic journals
English-language journals
Business and management journals
Bimonthly journals
Publications established in 1976